Travis Reed (born August 6, 1979) is an American retired professional basketball player. Reed played college basketball for UCLA and Long Beach State. He played professionally in the Netherlands, Estonia, Romania, Australia and Germany.

Professional career
He is left-handed and was known as a very effective player around the basket. He became an MVP of the Dutch League in the 2003–04 season, and won Dutch championship the same season with Hanzevast Capitals Groningen. In 2006, Reed joined BC Kalev/Cramo and with the team he won two Estonian Cups and two Estonian Championship silver medals. Eurobasket.com voted him 2006–07 Baltic Basketball League Player of the Year. Also was first team all league in Australian league.

Honours

Club
 Hanzevast Capitals
 Dutch Basketball League: 2003–04
 NBB Cup: 2004–05
 BC Kalev/Cramo
 Estonian Basketball Cup (2): 2006–07, 2007–08
 Korvpalli Meistriliiga: 2009–10

Individual
 EBBC Den Bosch
 DBL Statistical Player of the Year: 2002–03
 Hanzevast Capitals
 DBL Most Valuable Player: 2003–04
 DBL All-Star (3): 2004, 2005, 2006
 DBL All-Star Game MVP: 2004
 BC Kalev/Cramo
 Baltic Basketball League Season MVP: 2006–07
 Korvpalli Meistriliiga Season MVP: 2006–07

External links 
 Profile at court-side.com

1979 births
Living people
American expatriate basketball people in Estonia
American expatriate basketball people in Romania
American expatriate basketball people in Australia
American expatriate basketball people in the Netherlands
American expatriate basketball people in Germany
Basketball players from Los Angeles
BC Kalev/Cramo players
BC Tallinn Kalev players
Centers (basketball)
Donar (basketball club) players
Korvpalli Meistriliiga players
Long Beach State Beach men's basketball players
Power forwards (basketball)
Heroes Den Bosch players
UCLA Bruins men's basketball players
American men's basketball players